Roslagsbanan is a narrow gauge commuter railway system in Roslagen, Stockholm County, Sweden. It is built to the Swedish three foot gauge. The Storstockholms Lokaltrafik (SL) classifies it as "light rail" in its maps.

The line starts in Stockholm at Stockholm East Station (Stockholms östra station, Stockholm Ö). It goes north and splits into three branch lines at the junction stations Djursholms Ösby and Roslags Näsby; the three branches terminate at Näsbypark, Österskär and Kårsta.

It is double track between Stockholm and Viggbyholm and between Rydbo and Åkersberga. The rest is single track, but the line to Vallentuna was being doubled in 2012 and Rydbo-Åkers Runö in 2013. There are passing loops at some stations on the single track sections: at Altorp, Hägernäs, Österskär, Visinge, Täby kyrkby, Ormsta, Lindholmen and Kårsta.

Following a 2017 agreement between the Swedish state, Stockholm County, and the affected municipalities, the line will be extended to the centrally located underground hub T-Centralen, with construction to begin in approximately 2022.

History

The present Roslagsbanan was once just the southern part of a large narrow gauge system throughout Roslagen and eastern Uppland, connecting Stockholm and Uppsala with ports, smaller towns and parts of the countryside and used for both freight and passenger transport.

In 1885 the line from Stockholm East Station to Rimbo was opened, today the longest branch of Roslagsbanan. It was originally built and operated by the private enterprise Stockholm-Rimbo Järnväg (SRJ). In 1909 SRJ changed its name to Stockholm–Roslagens Järnvägar (with the same abbreviation) following the take-over of companies running adjacent lines.

Roslagsbanan is one of the oldest electrified railway lines for public transport in Europe. The first Stockholm–Djursholm suburban section, Djursholmsbanan, was electrified in 1892, and at the time continued into the city center by way of the tram network, ending at Engelbrektsplan next to Humlegården.

In the beginning of the 20th century and well into the 1950s, Djursholms Ösby, a branch station on Roslagsbanan, was one of the busiest railway stations in Sweden with  trains stopping every three minutes with three different branches dividing from there, transporting people and goods.

In the years following World War II, more and more of Swedish railways were nationalised through Statens Järnvägar (SJ), a fate also shared by Roslagsbanan. In 1969 Stockholm County took control over the Stockholm–Rimbo network (now referred to as 'Roslagsbanan') from SJ with the public transport company SL managing the railway.

In 1960 the Djursholmsbanan tracks to Engelbrektsplan were closed, making Stockholm East Station the system's terminus, thus passengers wishing to travel on with the Stockholm metro have had to transfer to the adjacent Tekniska högskolan metro station since 1973. One of the two Djursholm branches (Eddavägslinjen) was closed by SL in 1976.

When SL took over the railway it had many problems. It was narrow gauge and not connected to the rest of the rail network in any way. It was slow, being outperformed by busses, especially to the areas near the end of line, and it was mostly single-track and had low capacity. Because of this there was a strong political interest to close the railway and replace it with buses and a metro line to Täby. The public opinion was much against this and after a referendum in 1980 the county decided to save the Roslagsbanan and invest in new trains and modernize the infrastructure and formed a new company SLJ to run Roslagsbanan. Despite this the northernmost portion, Kårsta–Rimbo was closed in 1981, and the plan was to close the part Lindholmen–Kårsta as well, but it was temporarily kept due to the poor roads in the area which would be problematic for bus transport. Even though the roads have been improved the line to Kårsta is still in use today and there are currently no plans to close it.

Ownership and present use

The railway, owned by the Stockholm County Council through the public transport company Storstockholms Lokaltrafik (SL), is not part of the nationally owned network. It is the only narrow gauge railway in Sweden still in use for commercial traffic.

Roslagsbanan is part of the Stockholm public transport system. It is operated under contract by Transdev Sverige AB from 15 April 2022. Transdev took over operations from Arriva Sverige who had operated the network since 7 January 2013. Arriva Sverige in turn took over took over from the previous contracted company , which was a joint venture by the Danish DSB and Tågkompaniet.

Despite its age and non-standard gauge, it is one of the most used railways in Sweden. Since the late 1980s, the railway has constantly but slowly been upgraded to a modern standard with modernised rolling stock, higher platforms and straighter and double tracks allowing for increased speeds and more departures.

There are 15 departures to and from Stockholms Östra during the morning and evening peak hours respectively. In 2019, the railway had a ridership of 53,400 boardings per day.

Future
Roslagsbanan is to be diverted to a new terminus at T-Centralen via a new tunnel from Universitetet station to Odenplan station, and then parallel to the Stockholm City Line. This will allow passengers to commute faster within the city, as T-Centralen is served by all lines of the Stockholm Metro, all lines of the Stockholm Commuter Rail, as well as Spårväg City and is connected to Stockholm Central Station. When the extension is completed, Stockholms östra will become obsolete and close down. The stretch of track from Universitetet to the old terminus will be dismantled to make way for 500 apartments. The line will gain much more importance, and a further 1,500 flats are planned to be built along the line in Täby and Vallentuna municipalities, aiming to ease the ongoing housing crisis in Stockholm. The project is estimated to cost 7 billion kronor and is expected to be completed by 2026.

A feasibility study into extending the Roslagsbanan to Arlanda Airport was completed in 2010, followed by a public consultation in 2012.

Network 
The stations along Roslagsbanan are marked with a J symbol, which stands for the generic term  ("railway station") and is similar to the T symbol used by the Stockholm underground railway stations and the S used for tram stops.

Roslagsbanan is now used by Storstockholms Lokaltrafik (SL) for commuter transport. The present network comprises most of the southern part of what was once a much bigger network, made up of privately owned railways all over Roslagen, connecting Stockholm and Uppsala with the countryside and used for passenger and freight trains. See the  section of this article.

The line are only displayed on some trains; others only have the destination displayed.

In the timetables of Samtrafiken, the lines do not have the numbers as stated above, but the numbers 121 for the line to Kårsta, 122 for the line to Österskär and 123 for the line to Näsbypark.

Current networks previously connected to Roslagsbanan
Some of the northern parts of the once bigger network are still in use, but these are not formally called Roslagsbanan. These two parts are

Uppsala–Länna–Faringe (opened in 1876 to Länna, 1885 to Faringe); Tourist traffic only, see Upsala-Lenna Jernväg.
Dannemora–Gimo–Hargshamn–Hallstavik (Opened 1878; Dannemora–Hargshamn turned to normal gauge in the 1970s and extended into Hallstavik 1977; SJ freight only).

Closed parts of Roslagsbanan (south of Rimbo)
Stocksund – Långängen (1915-standard gauge tram) line, then converted to narrow gauge in 1934, closed in 1966)
Stockholm Ö – Engelbrektsplan (1895–1960)
Djursholms Ösby – Eddavägen (1890–1977)
Kårsta – Rimbo (1885–1981)

Stations

Rolling stock

The present train sets were manufactured by ABB Railcar (now Bombardier) and delivered in 1988–1995. The train sets are owned by SL, but maintained and operated by Roslagståg.

The trains are made up of three different bogie vehicle types:

Motor coach X10p Number of vehicles: 35, Seating capacity: 72, Length: , Weight: , Power rating: , Maximum speed: 
Driving trailer UBxp  Number of vehicles: 34, Seating capacity: 76, Length: , Weight: 
Intermediate trailer UBp Number of vehicles: 32, Seating capacity: 80, Length: , Weight: 

The trains were refurbished in 2011–2013, where some carriages were rebuilt with low floors, enabling wheelchair and pram access. The refurbishment also included new interiors and exteriors.
 
There are some problems with the rolling stock. Previously, the carriages had very poor wheelchair accessibility due to narrow doors and stairs; with the 2012–2016 refurbishment, this has been fixed on some carriages. The trains are also very noisy, especially considering the railway mostly goes through built up suburban areas.

Because of this, in 2010 SL began the process of finding a company from which to order modern trains to meet the rising demand for departures on Roslagsbanan. 22 new trains were ordered from Stadler Rail in 2016 and are scheduled to be delivered in 2020. They are going to be named X15p, with a new depot, Vallentunadepån, having been built just north of Vallentuna.

Older trains
The trains which were still in use until the early 1990s contained some vehicles dating from near the beginning of the 20th century. Some of these old brown and wooden wagons have been saved, the oldest ones being from 1914. They are owned by Spårvägsmuseet (Stockholm Tramway Museum) and are managed by Roslagsbanans Veterantågsförening (RBV) ("the Veteran Train Club for Roslagsbanan"), and can be chartered for events.

Some old trains have also been sold to other Swedish three foot gauge railways, which are now only heritage railways, where they are used for tourists.

Gallery

Present day

Historical

See also

History of rail transport in Sweden
Public transport in Stockholm
Rail transport in Sweden

References

External links

2021 Simplified map of Roslagsbanan lines  (pdf)
Storstockholms Lokaltrafik (Stockholm Transport) - Official site (English)
Storstockholms Lokaltrafik (Stockholm Transport) - Official site (Swedish)
Järnväg.net - Roslagsbanan  (Swedish)

Rail transport in Stockholm
Railway lines in Sweden
Regional rail in Sweden
891 mm gauge railways in Sweden
Railway lines opened in 1895
1500 V DC railway electrification
1895 establishments in Sweden